Großklein is a municipality in the district of Leibnitz in Styria, Austria.

Etymology

Its place name can be considered unusual as "groß" is German for "big" or "tall" while "klein" translates to "small", thus, it can be translated as "big-small".

However, this does not reflect the real origins of the name. The "-klein" portion, according to German linguist Fritz Lochner von Hüttenbach, likely stems from Slavic roots in form of the word "glina" (=clay, loam) or "kljun" (=beak). Modern Großklein (="large Klein") as well as its surrounding areas were once part of a larger area called "Klein". The name was changed in 1968 following a decision by the municipal council.

Geography
The municipality lies on the south Styrian Weinstraße.

References

Cities and towns in Leibnitz District